The United Labour Congress (ULC) was a national trade union federation bringing together unions in Nigeria.

The federation was founded on 18 December 2016, by about 25 unions which had formerly been affiliated to the Nigeria Labour Congress (NLC).  They argued that the leaders of the NLC had become detached from the concerns of their members and, in some cases, were using anti-democratic measures to remain in position.  The NLC adopted a conciliatory approach, stating that it would still offer protection to the unions which had formed the ULC.  In July 2020, the ULC rejoined the NLC.  ULC president Joe Ajaero became vice-president of the NLC.

Affiliates
The federation's affiliates included:

References

Trade unions in Nigeria
Trade unions established in 2016
Trade unions disestablished in 2020